The Leader of the Opposition is an unofficial title traditionally held by the leader of the largest party not in government in the Parliament of Albania. The Leader is invariably seen as the alternative Prime Minister of Albania to the present incumbent, and heads a rival alternative government known as the Shadow Cabinet.

Officeholders

See also
List of political parties in Albania
Parliament of Albania

Politics of Albania
Albania